Ayiri Emami ( born April 26, 1975) is a Nigerian businessman, politician, and philanthropist who is the chairman and chief executive officer of A & E group, a company with investments in oil and gas, construction, haulage, entertainment and the hospitality industry.

His first title was conferred on him by the Olu (king) of the Warri kingdom, Olu Atuwatse II. When his successor Ogiame Ikenwoli ascended the throne, he conferred on Ayiri Emami the title Ologbotsere (prime minister) of the Warri kingdom. He was suspended as Ologbotsere by the Ginuwa 1 Ruling House on 30 March 2021, and on October 5 2021, the Olu Ogiame Atuwatse III recalled his right to the title Ologbotsere.

Emami studied political science at Delta State university Abraka.  He was one of the youngest founding members of the Peoples Democratic Party (PDP) in Warri, Delta State, and was the party chairman in Warri South-West local government area.  He left the party and joined the ruling All Progressives Congress (APC) in Delta State in April 2015, becoming one of the party's leaders in the state.

He has served on the board of directors for Nigeria Cat Construction Company, and was the Chairman of the Delta State Waterways Security Committee, set up by the state government to reduce kidnapping and armed robbery in the Niger delta.

As a philanthropist, he has helped students finance their academic studies, and aided the financing of small scale businesses for members of his community.

In 2009, he married Asba Jite Emami. The couple has two children.

References

Nigerian businesspeople
Living people
1975 births
Delta State University, Abraka alumni